Hydrazoic acid, also known as hydrogen azide or azoimide, is a compound with the chemical formula . It is a colorless, volatile, and explosive liquid at room temperature and pressure. It is a compound of nitrogen and hydrogen, and is therefore a pnictogen hydride. It was first isolated in 1890 by Theodor Curtius. The acid has few applications, but its conjugate base, the azide ion, is useful in specialized processes.

Hydrazoic acid, like its fellow mineral acids, is soluble in water. Undiluted hydrazoic acid is dangerously explosive with a standard enthalpy of formation ΔfHo (l, 298K) = +264 kJ/mol. When dilute, the gas and aqueous solutions (<10%) can be safely prepared but should be used immediately; because of its low boiling point, hydrazoic acid is enriched upon evaporation and condensation such that dilute solutions incapable of explosion can form droplets in the headspace of the container or reactor that are capable of explosion.

Production
The acid is usually formed by acidification of an azide salt like sodium azide. Normally solutions of sodium azide in water contain trace quantities of hydrazoic acid in equilibrium with the azide salt, but introduction of a stronger acid can convert the primary species in solution to hydrazoic acid. The pure acid may be subsequently obtained by fractional distillation as an extremely explosive colorless liquid with an unpleasant smell.

Its aqueous solution can also be prepared by treatment of barium azide solution with dilute sulfuric acid, filtering the insoluble barium sulfate.

It was originally prepared by the reaction of aqueous hydrazine with nitrous acid:

With the hydrazinium cation  this reaction is written as:

Other oxidizing agents, such as hydrogen peroxide, nitrosyl chloride, trichloramine or nitric acid, can also be used to produce hydrazoic acid from hydrazine.

Destruction prior to disposal

Hydrazoic acid reacts with nitrous acid:

This reaction is unusual in that it involves compounds with nitrogen in four different oxidation states.

Reactions
In its properties hydrazoic acid shows some analogy to the halogen acids, since it forms poorly soluble (in water) lead, silver and mercury(I) salts. The metallic salts all crystallize in the anhydrous form and decompose on heating, leaving a residue of the pure metal. It is a weak acid (pKa = 4.75.) Its heavy metal salts are explosive and readily interact with the alkyl iodides. Azides of heavier alkali metals (excluding lithium) or alkaline earth metals are not explosive, but decompose in a more controlled way upon heating, releasing spectroscopically-pure  gas. Solutions of hydrazoic acid dissolve many metals (e.g. zinc, iron) with liberation of hydrogen and formation of salts, which are called azides (formerly also called azoimides or hydrazoates).

Hydrazoic acid may react with carbonyl derivatives, including aldehydes, ketones, and carboxylic acids, to give an amine or amide, with expulsion of nitrogen. This is called Schmidt reaction or Schmidt rearrangement.

Dissolution in the strongest acids produces explosive salts containing the  ion, for example:

The ion  is isoelectronic to diazomethane .

The decomposition of hydrazoic acid, triggered by shock, friction, spark, etc. produces nitrogen and hydrogen:

Hydrazoic acid undergoes unimolecular decomposition at sufficient energy:

The lowest energy pathway produces NH in the triplet state, making it a spin-forbidden reaction. This is one of the few reactions whose rate has been determined for specific amounts of vibrational energy in the ground electronic state, by laser photodissociation studies. In addition, these unimolecular rates have been analyzed theoretically, and the experimental and calculated rates are in reasonable agreement.

Toxicity
Hydrazoic acid is volatile and highly toxic. It has a pungent smell and its vapor can cause violent headaches. The compound acts as a non-cumulative poison.

Applications
2-Furonitrile, a pharmaceutical intermediate and potential artificial sweetening agent has been prepared in good yield by treating furfural with a mixture of hydrazoic acid and perchloric acid in the presence of magnesium perchlorate in the benzene solution at 35 °C.

The all gas-phase iodine laser (AGIL) mixes gaseous hydrazoic acid with chlorine to produce excited nitrogen chloride, which is then used to cause iodine to lase; this avoids the liquid chemistry requirements of COIL lasers.

References

External links

OSHA: Hydrazoic Acid 

Acids
Azides
Nitrogen hydrides
Explosive chemicals
Explosive gases
Foul-smelling chemicals